The Sauber C37 is a Formula One racing car designed and constructed by Sauber to compete during the 2018 FIA Formula One World Championship. The car was driven by Marcus Ericsson and reigning Formula 2 champion Charles Leclerc, who replaced Pascal Wehrlein. The C37 made its competitive début at the 2018 Australian Grand Prix and uses a 2018-specification Ferrari engine. This was the last car to be raced under the Sauber name as they were renamed as Alfa Romeo for the 2019 season, although the team's structure has remained unchanged.

The chassis was designed by Jörg Zander, Luca Furbatto, Ian Wright and Nicolas Hennel with the car being powered with a customer Ferrari powertrain.

Design and development

Engine supply
The car was originally intended to use an engine supplied by Honda until the team underwent a reorganisation of its management structure and the agreement was abandoned. After using year-old Ferrari engines in 2017, Sauber renegotiated with Ferrari and secured current-specification engines as part of an agreement with sister marque Alfa Romeo.

Complete Formula One results
(key) (results in bold indicate pole position; results in italics indicate fastest lap)

 Driver failed to finish the race, but was classified as they had completed over 90% of the winner's race distance.

References

C37
2018 Formula One season cars